Kauko Kalervo Andersson (1 January 1913, Valkeala – 21 April 1979) was a Finnish electrician, civil servant and politician. He was a member of the Parliament of Finland from 1939 to 1948 and again for a short period from February to July 1951, representing the Social Democratic Party of Finland (SDP).

References

1913 births
1979 deaths
People from Valkeala
People from Viipuri Province (Grand Duchy of Finland)
Social Democratic Party of Finland politicians
Members of the Parliament of Finland (1939–45)
Members of the Parliament of Finland (1945–48)
Members of the Parliament of Finland (1948–51)
Finnish people of World War II